Mohammad Ashraf Naseri replaced longtime Zabul governor Delbar Jan Arman Shinwari in late March, 2009.

An ethnic Pashtun from Paktia Province, Naseri separated from the Ittihad-e Islami under Abdul Rasul Sayyaf in 1992 or 1993 and is now politically unaffiliated.

He has a BA in science from Kabul University. He was a teacher in Dawat aw Jahad University in Peshawar, an employee of UN Office on Project Services (UNOPS), an employee of the UN Development Program (UNDP), Advisor Minister for Refugees and Repatriation (under Azam Dafar), a policy committee director of the Counter narcotics Ministry, and a presidential advisor.

He reportedly has a good reputation in Paktia, and Wolesi Jirga members from Badghis Province were positive about his role during his tenure as governor.

Notes

Governors of Zabul Province
Pashtun people
1962 births
Living people
Governors of Badghis Province
People from Paktia Province